The Vermont State Guard (VSG) is the all-volunteer state defense force of the state of Vermont. The Vermont State Guard serves parallel to the Vermont National Guard, acting as a reserve force for the State of Vermont Military Department. The Vermont State Guard is a reserve force composed of individuals living as civilians when not activated, but the force can be activated in the event of an attack or natural disaster to serve as a force multiplier for the National Guard, and is assigned to fulfill the state mission of the National Guard when the National Guard is deployed.

Unlike the National Guard, the State Guard cannot be federalized or deployed outside the country. Rather, the VSG can only be called up by the governor, and cannot be deployed outside the state without the governor’s permission. The Vermont State Guard is authorized under Title 32, Section 109 of the United States Code and Title 20, Part 3, Chapter 61, of the Vermont State Statutes and was activated via Executive Order Number 67.

History
The Vermont State Guard traces its roots in the American colonial times with local Vermont militias such as the Green Mountain Boys. During the American Revolution, the Green Mountain Boys took part in the campaign against British forces under General John Burgoyne, and assisted in the capture of Fort Ticonderoga.

During the American Civil War, the Vermont Militia was expanded to include multiple units which served against the Confederates. Vermont regiments served in multiple battles, including the Battle of Antietam, the First Battle of Bull Run, the Second Battle of Bull Run. and the Battle of Gettysburg.

During World War II, Vermont's first modern state defense force, set aside as a state organization immune from federal service, was established. During World War II, the Vermont State Guard raised a force of 1,278 men and 131 officers to stand in for the National Guard, and, as summarized by Vermont Governor William H. Wills, "have guarded, at the request of the Federal government, vital structures such as bridges, electric plants and dams, under the worst of conditions, sub zero weather and inadequate clothing and equipment. They have been on call for many local emergencies such as forest fires, the finding of lost persons, searching for airplane crashes" during their service during World War II.

The modern incarnation of the Vermont State Guard was signed into law by Governor Richard A. Snelling on April 26, 1982.

Membership
Membership in the Vermont State Guard is open to all citizens of Vermont aged 17 to 80. Prospective members must pass a background check conducted by the Vermont Criminal Investigation Center (VCIC), and pay the accompanying $30 processing fee, as well as cover the cost of their own uniforms. Membership is open to civilians with no prior military service. The Vermont State Guard (VSG) is continually recruiting new members, as the VSG role has increased and become more critical as natural disasters and global conflicts have increased in scale and prevalence.

Training and duties
The Vermont State Guard can be called up by the Governor for any peacetime mission of the National Guard, such as acting as first responders to a natural or man-made disaster, quelling riots, or assisting in military funerals. The Vermont State Guard identifies the chief areas of focus of training and service as:

 Safe traffic and pedestrian control on non-public property.
 Military Emergency Management Specialists
 Emergency Shelter Management (Operations and Security)
 Emergency Medical Services (Doctors, Nurses, Mental Health and Paramedics)
 Assists local civil authorities
 Volunteer coordination
 Legal support (attorneys and paralegals)
 Support of the military community including their families.
 Emergency response training to VSG members and other individuals in the community.
 Information management and communications
 Chaplain services
 Ground Search and Rescue
 Operational support to Vermont Army and Air National Guard

Although training may take place one weekend per month for most members, members are only required to meet for training once per year if not called into active duty, and members may leave the organization at any time.

The Vermont State Guard has also helped staff National Guard armories that would otherwise be closed while the National Guard has been deployed.

Units

See also
Naval Militia
United States Coast Guard Auxiliary
Vermont Wing Civil Air Patrol

References

External links
The Vermont State Guard Website
Vermont State Guard 1941–1944: Footage from the Vermont State Guard in World War II on the Internet Archive

State defense forces of the United States
Military units and formations in Vermont
1982 establishments in Vermont